The 2009 Rink Hockey World Championship was the 39th edition of the Rink Hockey World Championship, held between 5 and 11 July 2009, in Vigo, Spain. It was disputed by 16 countries.

Format
The competition is disputed by 16 countries, divided in four groups of 4 teams each one.

Every game lasted 40 minutes, divided in 2 parts of 20 minutes.

Matches
All times are Central European Summer Time (UTC+2).

Group stage

Group A

Group B

Group C

Group D

Championship Knockout stage

5th–8th places bracket

9th–12th places bracket

13th–16th places bracket

Final standings

External links
Official
List of the Matches

Roller Hockey World Cup
Rink Hockey World Championship
World Championship
Rink Hockey World Championship